Mozilla Prism (formerly WebRunner) is a discontinued project which integrated web applications with the desktop, allowing web applications to be launched from the desktop and configured independently of the default web browser. As of November 2010, Prism is listed as an inactive project at the Mozilla labs website.

Prism is based on a concept called a site-specific browser (SSB). An SSB is designed to work exclusively with one web application. It doesn't have the menus, toolbars and other accoutrements of a traditional web browser.

The software is built upon XULRunner, so it is possible to get some Mozilla Firefox extensions to work in it.

The preview announcement of Prism was made in October 2007.

On February 1, 2011, Mozilla Labs announced it would no longer maintain Prism, its ideas having been subsumed into a newer project called Chromeless. However, the Mozilla Labs mailing list revealed that Chromeless is not in fact a replacement for Prism, and there is currently no Mozilla replacement for the out-of-the-box site-specific browser functionality of Prism, Chromeless instead being a platform for developers rather than users. For a while Prism continued to be maintained under the original name of WebRunner, which then also was discontinued in September 2011.

See also

 Chromium Embedded Framework
 Site-specific browser
 Rich Internet application
 Fluid (web browser)

References

External links

Prism Project at Mozilla Development Center
Prism extension for Firefox 3.0
Prism - MozillaWiki
prism.mozillalabs.com/ via Internet Archive

Free application software
Cross-platform free software
Free software programmed in C++
Prism
Site-specific browsing
2007 software
Discontinued software